Ghazi Beg, 38th Shirvanshah, succeeded his brother in 1501. His entire reign was during a 6-month siege of Baku by the Safavid Shah Ismail I. He was a weak ruler, who ruled briefly only Baku, Salyan and Mahmudabad. Although he resisted the Safavid siege for 6 months, he executed envoys of Ismail and a dargha who advised to him to make peace. He was forced to give up city after the Storming of Baku by the Safavid army. He was killed by his son, Sultan Mahmud, in the same year.

Sources 
 

1501 deaths
Year of birth unknown
16th-century people of Safavid Iran